Siala-Mou Siliga (surname pronounced Sahlingah, born October 8, 1970), often billed as Mighty Mo is a former American Samoan kickboxer, bare knuckle boxer, boxer and mixed martial artist who competed in the Heavyweight division. His K-1 achievements include winning the K-1 World Grand Prix 2004 in Las Vegas II and the K-1 World Grand Prix 2007 in Hawaii tournaments. In mixed martial arts, he has competed for K-1 Hero's, Bellator MMA, DREAM, Road FC and also participated in the Dynamite!! USA and Dynamite!! 2008 events. On September 24, 2016 Siliga won the Road FC Openweight Tournament at Road FC 33 by knocking out Choi Hong-man of South Korea.

Career

Kickboxing
Mighty Mo made his K-1 debut on February 15, 2004 at "K-1 Burning" event in Japan against Hiraku Hori. He knocked out Hori at 1:22 in 4th round by right hook. After losing in semifinals at his first 8-man tournament in Las Vegas against fellow American Dewey Cooper, Mighty Mo made a huge comeback four months later at the Battle of Bellagio II, winning his first K-1 GP Championship by knocking out Brecht Wallis in 2nd Round at the tournament finals.

After a year off from K-1, he made his comeback on March 4, 2007 at Yokohama, Japan. His opponent was Choi Hong-man (218 cm/7′2″) from Korea who had never been knocked out before on his K-1 career until Mighty Mo (185 cm/6′1″) managed to land his trademark right overhand punch, winning the fight by KO at 0:50 KO in 2nd round. At that time, he held the record for the "Biggest height difference wins (33cm/12.9inches)" resulting in a KO in favor of the shorter in K-1 history. But on December 31, 2007, at the K-1 Dynamite Tournament in Osaka, the record was surpassed by Danish Karate fighter Nicholas Pettas (178 cm/5′10″), who was able to KO the 217cm/7′1.½″ Korean Kim Young-hyun (39 cm/15.3inches height difference).
In professional Boxing the record stands at 38cm/14.9inches height difference when Randy Davis (1.80m/5′11″) knocked out Tom Payne (2.18m/7′2″) in 1985.

On April 28, 2007, Mo entered the K-1 World GP 2007 in Hawaii tournament as a heavy favorite. He knocked out all three of his opponents and earned himself a spot in the K-1 World GP 2007 Elimination in Seoul, Korea.

On June 23, 2007, Mighty Mo lost to defending K-1 Super Heavyweight Champion Semmy Schilt by unanimous decision at the K-1 World GP in Amsterdam. Semmy used his reach to keep Mighty Mo at bay, and Mo was unable to get in close enough to land his devastating overhand right. Rumors surfaced that Mo was nursing a knee and hand injuries from his previous fights. He had fought 7 times in the last 4 months.

At the K-1 Final Eliminations 2007 on September 29, he faced Choi Hong-man again and lost by unanimous decision. During the fight, he was kicked in the groin and was inexplicably ruled a knockdown by the referee. He was quoted in the post-fight interview: "I feel I was robbed. I should have won. There was a lot of favoritism here. He must have picked up a new technique-a kick below the belt. So next time I'll wear a thicker cup. And next time I want to fight somewhere else."

In his next three fights he went 1-2, losing to Paul Slowinski and Keijiro Maeda before defeating Justice Smith on August 9, 2008.

Mighty Mo had replaced Andrei Arlovski at the K-1 World Grand Prix 2010 in Seoul Final 16 held in Seoul against Romanian Raul Cătinaș and won by unanimous decision. As a result, Mo was the only American to make it into the K-1 World Grand Prix 2010 Final on December, 11th. His quarterfinal opponent was Peter Aerts who beat him via TKO in the first round.

Mighty Mo was knocked out by Russian Sergei Kharitonov at the United Glory World Series Finals in Moscow on May 28, 2011.

As of October 2011 Mighty Mo is currently on a six fight losing streak in Kickboxing, all but one by knockout.

He was next set to face Rick Roufus in Las Vegas on October 22, 2011. However, he was not medically cleared to compete.

He rematched Raul Cătinaş, the last man he was able to defeat, in a non-tournament bout at the SuperKombat World Grand Prix 2012 Final in Bucharest, Romania on December 22, 2012 and lost on a unanimous decision.

Mixed martial arts career
Mo made his professional MMA debut in October 2003.  He won his first three MMA fights all by knockout over a period of three and a half years.

Dynamite!!
Mo was originally supposed to face Choi Mu-bae in a MMA match at K-1 Dynamite!! USA on June 2 in Los Angeles, California. But Choi was replaced in the last minute by Ruben "Warpath" Villareal. Mighty Mo dominated Villareal, forcing the referee, Herb Dean, to stop the fight at 1:33 of the first round.

Mo next faced K-1 kickboxing champion Semmy Schilt at the Fields Dynamite!! 2008 2008 event in an MMA bout, in which Schilt defeated Mighty Mo in the first round by triangle choke.

DREAM
In 2009, Mo signed with the DREAM promotion in Japan.  He was set to fight Mirko "Cro Cop" Filipović at DREAM 10 but Cro Cop pulled out after re-signing with the UFC.

Mo instead made his debut against Josh Barnett at DREAM 13 on March 21, 2010 and lost via submission in the first round.

Bellator MMA
In 2013, Mo refocused his efforts on MMA and signed with Bellator MMA. He made his debut in September 2013 at Bellator 100 where he defeated Dan Charles by TKO.  Mo returned just over a month later at Bellator 106 where he defeated Ron Sparks by submission.

In March 2014, Mo entered the Bellator Season Ten Heavyweight Tournament. He faced fellow kickboxer Peter Graham in the opening round at Bellator 111 on March 7, 2014. Mo won the fight via submission in the third round. In the semifinals, Mo faced Russian fighter Alexander Volkov on April 11, 2014 at Bellator 116. He lost the fight via knockout in the first round.

Mo was released from the organization on August 25, 2014.

Road FC
On October 9, 2015 at Road FC 026 in Seoul, South Korea, Mo defeated Choi Mu-bae by 1st-round KO in 37 seconds. On December 26 at Road FC 027 in Shanghai, China, Mo defeated Choi Mu-bae by Technical Knockout at the 3:46 mark of round 1, in a rematch of their Road FC 26 match up.

On April 16, 2016 at Road FC 030 in Beijing, China, Mo defeated Hyun-man Myung by neck crank in round 3 to win Openweight tournament semi-finals. On September 24 at Road FC 033 in Seoul, South Korea, Mo defeated Choi Hong-man by knockout in round 4 to win the Road FC Openweight Championship. On September 25 Mo signed an exclusive contract with the Road FC. On December 10 at Road FC 035 in Seoul, South Korea, Mo retained his Openweight Title with a first-round knockout of Carlos Toyota. Mo next faced Dong-gook Kang at Road FC 040, winning the fight via technical knockout in the second round. Mo fought Gilbert Yvel at Road FC 47, losing the fight via armbar submission in the first round.	

Bare-Knuckle Boxing
Mighty Mo entered the Valor Bare Knuckle 1 Heavyweight Tournament, VBK:1; this was the debut event for Ken Shamrock's newly founded bare-knuckle boxing organization. Mighty Mo defeated Sokoudjou by 3rd round TKO and entered the finals against Mark Godbeer. Unlike Godbeer, Mighty Mo had not been able to quickly defeat his prior opponent (Godbeer quickly knocked out his first opponent in less than a minute). He lost via TKO after he was unable to get up in time to answer the 10 count

Fighting Style
Mighty Mo is largely a stand-up fighter known for his strong striking power; he specifically possesses a powerful overhand-right and has used it to knock out several of his opponents.

Championships and Accomplishments

Mixed Martial Arts
Bellator MMA
Bellator Season Ten Heavyweight Tournament Semifinalist
Universal Above Ground Fighting
U.A.G.F. Heavyweight Championship (One time)
Road Fighting Championship
Road FC Openweight Champion (First; current)
Two Successful Title Defenses
2016 Road FC Openweight Tournament Winner

Kickboxing
K-1
K-1 World Grand Prix 2010 in Bucharest 3rd Place
2007 K-1 World Grand Prix in Hawaii Champion
2004 K-1 World Grand Prix in Las Vegas II Champion

Bare-Knuckle Boxing
Valor Bare Knuckle
VKB:1 Heavyweight Tournament Finalist

Other

 North West Toughman Champion

Mixed martial arts record

|-
| Loss
| align=center| 12–6
| Gilbert Yvel
| Technical Submission (armbar)
| Road FC 047
| May 12, 2018
| align=center| 1
| align=center| 3:43
| Beijing, China
| 
|-
| Win
| align=center| 12–5
| Dong-gook Kang
| TKO (punches)
| Road FC 040
| July 15, 2017
| align=center| 2
| align=center| 2:27
| Seoul, South Korea
| 
|-
| Win
| align=center| 11–5
| Carlos Toyota
| KO (punches)
| Road FC 035
| December 10, 2016
| align=center| 1
| align=center| 1:10
| Seoul, South Korea
| 
|-
| Win
| align=center| 10–5
| Hong-man Choi
| KO (punch)
| Road FC 033
| September 24, 2016
| align=center| 1
| align=center| 4:06
| Seoul, South Korea
| 
|-
| Win
| align=center| 9–5
| Hyun-man Myung
| Submission (neck crank)
| Road FC 030 in China
| April 16, 2016
| align=center| 3
| align=center| 1:12
| Beijing, China
| 
|-
| Win
| align=center| 8–5
| Mu-bae Choi
| TKO (punches)
| Road FC 027 in China
| 
| align=center| 1
| align=center| 3:46
| Shanghai, China
| 
|-
| Win
| align=center| 7–5
| Mu-bae Choi
| KO (punch)
| Road FC 026
| 
| align=center| 1
| align=center| 0:37
| Seoul, South Korea
| 
|-
| Loss
| align=center| 6–5
| Denis Stojnić
| Decision (unanimous)
| HIT-FC
| 
| align=center| 3
| align=center| 5:00
| Zurich, Switzerland
| 
|-
| Loss
| align=center| 6–4
| Alexandru Lungu
| TKO (punches)
| Real Xtreme Fighting 15
| 
| align=center| 1
| align=center| 0:52
| Bucharest, Romania
| 
|-
| Loss
| align=center| 6–3
| Alexander Volkov
| KO (head kick)
| Bellator 116
| 
| align=center| 1
| align=center| 2:44
| Temecula, California, United States
| 
|-
| Win
| align=center| 6–2
| Peter Graham
| Submission (Arm-Triangle Choke)
| Bellator 111
| 
| align=center| 3
| align=center| 2:31
| Thackerville, Oklahoma, United States
| 
|-
| Win
| align=center| 5–2
| Ron Sparks
| Submission (Keylock)
| Bellator 105
| 
| align=center| 1
| align=center| 2:52
| Rio Rancho, New Mexico, United States
| 
|-
| Win
| align=center| 4–2
| Dan Charles
| TKO (punches)
| Bellator 100
| 
| align=center| 3
| align=center| 1:26
| Phoenix, Arizona, United States
| 
|-
| Loss
| align=center| 3–2
| Josh Barnett
| Submission (Kimura)
| DREAM 13
| 
| align=center| 1
| align=center| 4:41
| Yokohama, Kanagawa, Japan
| 
|-
| Loss
| align=center| 3–1
| Semmy Schilt
| Submission (triangle choke)
| Fields Dynamite!! 2008
| 
| align=center| 1
| align=center| 5:31
| Saitama, Saitama, Japan
| 
|-
| Win
| align=center| 3–0
| Ruben Villareal
| TKO (punches)
| Dynamite!! USA
| 
| align=center| 1
| align=center| 1:33
| Los Angeles, California, United States
| 
|-
| Win
| align=center| 2–0
| Min-soo Kim
| KO (punch)
| HERO'S 8
| 
| align=center| 1
| align=center| 2:37
| Nagoya, Aichi, Japan
| 
|-
| Win
| align=center| 1–0
| Mark Smith
| KO (knee to the body)
| UAGF 4: Ultimate Cage Fighting
| 
| align=center| 2
| 2:36
| Upland, California, United States
| 

Kickboxing record (Incomplete)

|-  style="background:#cfc;"
|2018-11-17 || Win ||align=left| Kengo Shimizu
||Rise 129
|Tokyo, Japan
||TKO (punches)
||3 ||0:55
|-  style="background:#fbb;"
|2018-09-17 || Loss || align=left| Jairo Kusunoki ||HEAT 43 || Kariya, Japan ||Extra Round Decision ||4
|| 3:00
|-  style="background:#fbb;"
|2015-12-5 ||Loss ||align=left| Tomáš Hron ||GIBU Fight Night 2  ||Prague, Czech Republic ||KO ||2|| N/A
|-  style="background:#fbb;"
|2015-02-01
|Loss
|align=left| Konstantin Gluhov
|Kunlun Fight 18
|Guangzhou, China
|TKO (fist injury)
|align="center"|1
|align="center"|2:00
|-
!  style=background:white colspan=8 |
|-  style="background:#fbb;"
|2012-12-22
|Loss
|align=left| Raul Cătinaș
|SUPERKOMBAT World Grand Prix 2012 Final
|Bucharest, Romania
|Decision (unanimous)
|align="center"|3
|align="center"|3:00
|-  style="background:#fbb;"
|2012-09-08
|Loss
|align=left| Rick Roufus
|K-1 World Grand Prix 2012 in Los Angeles
|Los Angeles, California, USA
|Decision (split)
|align="center"|3
|align="center"|3:00
|-
!  style=background:white colspan=8 |
|-  style="background:#fbb;"
|2012-03-03
|Loss
|align=left| Florian Pavic
|3rd Steko Fight Night
|Munich, Germany
|Decision 
|align="center"|5
|align="center"|3:00
|-  style="background:#fbb;"
|2011-11-23
|Loss
|align=left| Raoumaru
|RISE 85: Heavyweight Tournament 2011
|Tokyo, Japan
|KO (knee)
|align="center"|3
|align="center"|2:49
|-
!  style=background:white colspan=8 |
|-  style="background:#fbb;"
|2011-07-30
|Loss
|align=left| Ben Edwards
|Capital Punishment 4
|Canberra, Australia
|KO (right knee)
|align="center"|2
|align="center"|2:18
|-  style="background:#fbb;"
|2011-07-16
|Loss
|align=left| Mladen Brestovac
|SUPERKOMBAT World Grand Prix II 2011
|Constanța, Romania
|KO (left kick to the body)
|align="center"|1
|align="center"|2:18
|-
!  style=background:white colspan=8 |
|-  style="background:#fbb;"
|2011-05-28
|Loss
|align=left| Sergei Kharitonov
|United Glory 14: 2010-2011 World Series Finals
|Moscow, Russia
|KO (right uppercut)
|align="center"|1
|align="center"|1:59
|-  style="background:#fbb;"
|2010-12-11
|Loss
|align=left| Peter Aerts
|K-1 World Grand Prix 2010 Final
|Tokyo, Japan
|KO (punches and kick)
|align="center"|1
|align="center"|2:20
|-
!  style=background:white colspan=8 |
|-  style="background:#cfc;"
|2010-10-2
|Win
|align=left| Raul Cătinaș
|K-1 World Grand Prix 2010 in Seoul Final 16
|Seoul, South Korea
|Decision (unanimous)
|align="center"|3
|align="center"|3:00
|-
!  style=background:white colspan=8 |
|-  style="background:#fbb;"
|2010-05-21
|Loss
|align=left| Sebastian Ciobanu
|K-1 World Grand Prix 2010 in Bucharest
|Bucharest, Romania
|KO (kick to the throat)
|align="center"|1
|align="center"|2:24
|-
!  style=background:white colspan=8 |
|-  style="background:#cfc;"
|2010-05-21
|Win
|align=left| Roman Kleibl
|K-1 World Grand Prix 2010 in Bucharest
|Bucharest, Romania
|KO 
|align="center"|3
|align="center"|1:56
|-
!  style=background:white colspan=8 |
|-  style="background:#fbb;"
|2009-10-24
|Loss
|align=left| Cătălin Moroşanu
|K-1 ColliZion 2009 Final Elimination 
|Arad, Romania
|Extra Round Decision (split)
|align="center"|4
|align="center"|3:00
|-  style="background:#cfc;"
|2008-08-09
|Win
|align=left| Justice Smith
|K-1 World Grand Prix 2008 in Hawaii
|Honolulu, Hawaii, USA
|Decision (majority)
|align="center"|3
|align="center"|3:00
|-
!  style=background:white colspan=8 |
|-  style="background:#fbb;"
|2008-04-13
|Loss
|align=left| Kyotaro
|K-1 World Grand Prix 2008 in Yokohama 
|Yokohama, Japan
|Extra Round Decision (unanimous)
|align="center"|4
|align="center"|3:00
|-  style="background:#fbb;"
|2007-12-8
|Loss
|align=left| Paul Slowinski
|K-1 World Grand Prix 2007 Final
|Yokohama, Japan
|TKO (low kicks)
|align="center"|2
|align="center"|0:50
|-  style="background:#fbb;"
|2007-09-29
|Loss
|align=left| Choi Hong-man
|K-1 World Grand Prix 2007 in Seoul Final 16
|Seoul, South Korea
|Decision (unanimous)
|align="center"|3
|align="center"|3:00
|-
!  style=background:white colspan=8 |
|-  style="background:#fbb;"
|2007-08-11
|Loss
|align=left| Stefan Leko
|K-1 World Grand Prix 2007 in Las Vegas
|Las Vegas, Nevada, USA
|Decision (unanimous)
|align="center"|3
|align="center"|3:00
|-  style="background:#fbb;"
|2007-06-23
|Loss
|align=left| Semmy Schilt
|K-1 World Grand Prix 2007 in Amsterdam
|Amsterdam, Netherlands
|Decision (unanimous)
|align="center"|3
|align="center"|3:00
|-
!  style=background:white colspan=8 |
|-  style="background:#cfc;"
|2007-04-04
|Win
|align=left| Aleksandr Pitchkounov
|K-1 World Grand Prix 2007 in Hawaii
|Honolulu, Hawaii, USA
|KO (punches)
|align="center"|3
|align="center"|0:46
|-
!  style=background:white colspan=8 |
|-  style="background:#cfc;"
|2007-04-04
|Win
|align=left| Jan Nortje
|K-1 World Grand Prix 2007 in Hawaii
|Honolulu, Hawaii, USA
|KO (right punch)
|align="center"|2
|align="center"|1:50
|-
!  style=background:white colspan=8 |
|-  style="background:#cfc;"
|2007-04-04
|Win
|align=left| Kim Kyoung-suk
|K-1 World Grand Prix 2007 in Hawaii
|Honolulu, Hawaii, USA
|KO (straight punch)
|align="center"|1
|align="center"|1:37
|-
!  style=background:white colspan=8 |
|-  style="background:#cfc;"
|2007-03-04
|Win
|align=left| Choi Hong-man
|K-1 World Grand Prix 2007 in Yokohama
|Yokohama, Japan
|KO (right overhand)
|align="center"|2
|align="center"|0:50
|-  style="background:#cfc;"
|2006-11-04
|Win
|align=left| Abdel Lamidi
|K-1 Fighting Network Riga 2006
|Riga, Latvia
|KO (right overhand)
|align="center"|1
|align="center"|2:17
|-  style="background:#fbb;"
|2006-07-30
|Loss
|align=left| Remy Bonjasky
|K-1 World Grand Prix 2006 in Sapporo
|Sapporo, Japan
|Decision (unanimous)
|align="center"|3
|align="center"|3:00
|-  style="background:#fbb;"
|2005-09-23
|Loss
|align=left| Peter Aerts
|K-1 World Grand Prix 2005 in Osaka - Final Elimination
|Osaka, Japan
|KO (left low kick)
|align="center"|2
|align="center"|0:42
|-  style="background:#cfc;"
|2005-08-13
|Win
|align=left| Francois Botha
|K-1 World Grand Prix 2005 in Las Vegas II
|Las Vegas, Nevada, USA
|TKO (3 knockdowns)
|align="center"|1
|align="center"|1:20
|-  style="background:#cfc;"
|2005-04-30
|Win
|align=left| Remy Bonjasky
|K-1 World Grand Prix 2005 in Las Vegas
|Las Vegas, Nevada, USA
|Decision (split)
|align="center"|3
|align="center"|3:00
|-  style="background:#fbb;"
|2004-12-04
|Loss
|align=left| Kaoklai Kaennorsing
|K-1 World Grand Prix 2004 Final
|Tokyo, Japan
|KO (right high kick)
|align="center"|1
|align="center"|2:40
|-  style="background:#cfc;"
|2004-09-25
|Win
|align=left| Gary Goodridge
|K-1 World Grand Prix 2004 Final Elimination
|Tokyo, Japan 
|TKO (3 knockdowns)
|align="center"|1
|align="center"|2:58
|-  style="background:#cfc;"
|2004-08-7
|Win
|align=left| Brecht Wallis
|K-1 World Grand Prix 2004 in Las Vegas II
|Las Vegas, Nevada, USA
|KO (right overhand)
|align="center"|2
|align="center"|2:55
|-
!  style=background:white colspan=8 |
|-  style="background:#cfc;"
|2004-08-07
|Win
|align=left| Scott Lighty
|K-1 World Grand Prix 2004 in Las Vegas II
|Las Vegas, Nevada, USA
|KO (right overhand)
|align="center"|1
|align="center"|1:29
|-
!  style=background:white colspan=8 |
|-  style="background:#cfc;"
|2004-08-07
|Win
|align=left| Sergei Gur
|K-1 World Grand Prix 2004 in Las Vegas II
|Las Vegas, Nevada, USA
|Decision (unanimous)
|align="center"|3
|align="center"|3:00
|-
!  style=background:white colspan=8 |
|-  style="background:#fbb;"
|2004-04-30
|Loss
|align=left| Dewey Cooper
|K-1 World Grand Prix 2004 in Las Vegas I
|Las Vegas, Nevada, USA
|Decision (unanimous)
|align="center"|3
|align="center"|3:00
|-
!  style=background:white colspan=8 |
|-  style="background:#cfc;"
|2004-04-30
|Win
|align=left| Carter Williams
|K-1 World Grand Prix 2004 in Las Vegas I
|Las Vegas, Nevada, USA
|TKO 
|align="center"|3
|align="center"|1:52
|-
!  style=background:white colspan=8 |
|-  style="background:#cfc;"
|2004-02-15
|Win
|align=left| Hiraku Hori
|K-1 Burning 2004
|Okinawa, Japan
|KO (right hook)
|align="center"|4
|align="center"|1:22
|-
| colspan=8 | Legend:    

Boxing record

|-
|1
|Win
|2–1
|align=left| William Jackson
|KO
|1
|N/A
|
|Marriott Hotel, Irvine, California, USA
|
|-
|2
|Win
|1–1
|align=left| Christopher Valente
|KO
|1
|N/A
|
|Morongo Casino Resort & Spa, Cabazon, California, USA
|
|-
|3
|Loss
|0–1
|align=left| Lamar Stephens
|PTS
|3
|3:00
|
|Hard Rock Live Arena, Hollywood, Florida, USA
|
|-
| colspan=10 | Legend'':

Bare-Knuckle Boxing

|-
|Loss
|align=center|1–1
|Mark Godbeer
|TKO (stoppage)
|VKB-Valor Bare Knuckle 1 
|
|align=center|1
|align=center|2:56
|New Town, ND, USA, 4 Bears Casino and Lodge
|
|-
|Win
|align=center|1–0
|Rameau Thierry Sokoudjou
|TKO (punches)
|VKB-Valor Bare Knuckle 1 
|
|align=center|3
|align=center|1:26
|New Town, ND, USA, 4 Bears Casino and Lodge
|

See also
List of K-1 events
List of K-1 champions
List of male kickboxers

References

External links

Mighty Mo from Tapology
Profile at K-1

1970 births
Living people
American Samoan male boxers
Boxers from California
Heavyweight boxers
American male kickboxers
Samoan male kickboxers
Kickboxers from California
Heavyweight kickboxers
American male mixed martial artists
Samoan male mixed martial artists
Mixed martial artists from California
Super heavyweight mixed martial artists
Mixed martial artists utilizing boxing
Mixed martial artists utilizing kickboxing
American male boxers
Road FC champions
Road Fighting Championship champions
Kunlun Fight kickboxers
SUPERKOMBAT kickboxers
People from Pago Pago